Anemotrochus is a genus of flowering plants belonging to the family Apocynaceae.

Its native range is Caribbean.

Species:

Anemotrochus eggersii 
Anemotrochus viridivenius 
Anemotrochus yamanigueyensis

References

Apocynaceae
Apocynaceae genera